Ernestina Maenza (22 December 1908 – 25 July 1995) was a Spanish alpine skier. She competed in the women's combined event at the 1936 Winter Olympics with Margot Moles being the first Spanish female to participate in a Winter Olympic Games.

She was married with Enrique Herreros mountaineer, humorist, drafter, poster artist, filmmaker and mountaineer, with whom she had a child.

References

1908 births
1995 deaths
Spanish female alpine skiers
Olympic alpine skiers of Spain
Alpine skiers at the 1936 Winter Olympics
People from Lucena, Córdoba
Sportspeople from the Province of Córdoba (Spain)